Jena Friedman is an American comedian and writer. She is the host of the comedic true-crime series Indefensible on AMC Plus. She has been a field producer at The Daily Show with Jon Stewart and has written for Late Show with David Letterman. She is the creator of Soft Focus with Jena Friedman for Adult Swim, the first installment of which premiered in February 2018.

Early life
Friedman was born in Haddonfield, New Jersey. She studied anthropology at Northwestern University. After graduation, she worked as a healthcare consultant for consulting firm Booz Allen Hamilton.

Career
She has appeared in the Sundance hit movie Palm Springs, and on TV shows such as Conan, The Late Show with Stephen Colbert, The Nightly Show with Larry Wilmore, National Geographic Explorer, MSNBC, and BBC Two. She has also been a contributing writer to The New Yorker.

In 2007, she wrote The Refugee Girls Revue, a satire inspired by American Girl dolls. The play earned critical acclaim in the 2008 New York International Fringe Festival and had a successful run Off-Broadway. In 2010, she received a cease-and-desist letter from The New York Times for parodying their wedding videos. The parody, titled Ted and Gracie, has since become a popular web series.

In 2015, Friedman's solo show American Cunt, premiered in the Edinburgh Festival Fringe to critical acclaim. The magazine Paste named American Cunt one of the 10 Best Stand Up Comedy Specials of 2016. She created Soft Focus with Jena Friedman, a series of Adult Swim specials that she also co-executive produces, directs, and hosts. The specials include interviews with John McAfee, the American software entrepreneur and Presidential hopeful, as well as Gilberto Valle, a New York City police officer who was convicted of a conspiracy to kidnap, cook, and eat women, better known as the "Cannibal Cop". The second installment premiered in January 2019.

In 2020, Friedman contributed to the screenplay of Borat Subsequent Moviefilm, earning her a nomination for the Academy Award for Best Adapted Screenplay. She directed and starred in True Crime Story: Indefensible on Sundance TV in 2021. Her latest comedy special, Ladykiller, premiered on Peacock in September of 2022.

Bibliography 

 
———————
Notes

References

External links

Living people
Year of birth missing (living people)
21st-century American Jews
21st-century American comedians
21st-century American screenwriters
21st-century American women writers
Actresses from New York City
American feminists
American stand-up comedians
American television writers
American women comedians
American women television writers
Comedians from New York City
Conservative Jewish feminists
Feminist artists
Jewish American female comedians
New York (state) Democrats
The New Yorker people
Northwestern University alumni
Screenwriters from New York (state)